The C. Hart Merriam Award is given annually by the American Society of Mammalogists for "outstanding research in mammalogy".

The Merriam Award was established in 1974. Before 1996 the award was given for "outstanding contributions to mammalogy through research, teaching, and service". The award is named in honor of C. Hart Merriam (1855–1942). He was not only a founding member of the American Society of Mammalogists and a physician with an M.D. from Columbia University, but also "naturalist, ethnologist, explorer, scholar, lecturer, author, personal friend of Presidents ..."

References

Biology awards
Awards established in 1974